Valentina Serena (born 10 November 1981, in Oderzo) is an Italian professional volleyball player, playing as a setter. She now plays for Igtisadchi Baku in Azerbaijan.

Career
She has been playing professionally across Europe for several years, in 2012/2013 season she helped her team to win the CEV Champion Cup, the victory over Fenerbahçe in the finals.

Clubs
  San Dona 1996–1998
  Rinascita Fireze 1998–1999
  Granzotto San Dona 1999–2000
  Johnson Matthey Spezzano 2000–2001
  Famila Imola 2001–2002
  Cuneo Volley 2002–2003
  Conegliano 2003–2004
  Pallavolo Sassuolo 2004–2005
  Lines Altamura 2005–2006
  Zoppas Industries Conegliano 2006–2009
  Ancaragucu 2009–2010
  Foppapedretti Bergamo 2009–2010
  Futura Volley Busto Arsizio 2010–2011
  Foppapedretti Bergamo 2011–2012
  Bank BPS Muszynianka Fakro Muszyna 2012–2013
  Igtisadchi Baku 2013–2014

Awards

Clubs 
 2012-13 CEV Cup -  Champion, with Bank BPS Muszynianka Fakro Muszyna
 2013-14 Azerbaijan Super League -  3rd place, with Igtisadchi Baku

References

1981 births
Living people
Sportspeople from the Province of Treviso
Italian women's volleyball players
Igtisadchi Baku volleyball players
LGBT volleyball players